Cold Beer Conversation is the twenty-ninth studio album by American country music artist George Strait.  It was released on September 25, 2015 via MCA Nashville.  The album's first single, "Let It Go", was released to radio on April 20, 2015.

Commercial performance
Cold Beer Conversation debuted on the Billboard 200 at No. 4 and Top Country Albums at No. 1, selling 86,000 units, 83,000 of which are pure album sales. It reached No. 1 on the Top Country Albums chart in its second week, with another 30,000 units sold, making it Strait's 26th No. 1 on this chart.  The album has sold 231,500 copies in the US as of April 2016.

Track listing

Personnel
From Cold Beer Conversation liner notes.

Musicians
Buddy Cannon - background vocals
Perry Coleman - background vocals
J. T. Corenflos - electric guitar
Stuart Duncan - fiddle, mandolin, acoustic guitar
Thom Flora - background vocals
Paul Franklin - steel guitar, Dobro
Wes Hightower - background vocals
Jamey Johnson - background vocals
Brent Mason - electric guitar, acoustic guitar
Mac McAnally - acoustic guitar, ukulele, background vocals
Greg Morrow - drums, percussion
Mike Rojas - piano, Hammond B-3 organ, synthesizer, accordion
Marty Slayton - background vocals
George Strait - lead vocals
Lee Ann Womack - background vocals
Glenn Worf - bass guitar, upright bass

Production
Chuck Ainlay - production, engineering, mixing
Wayne Brezinka - artwork
T. W. Cargile - engineering
Bob Ludwig - mastering
Karen Naff - art direction
Brandon Schexnayder - engineering
George Strait - production

Chart positions

Weekly charts

Year-end charts

Singles

References

2015 albums
George Strait albums
MCA Records albums
Albums produced by Chuck Ainlay